Manicomyia is a genus of tephritid  or fruit flies in the family Tephritidae.

Species
Manicomyia chirindana Munro, 1935

References

Tephritinae
Tephritidae genera
Diptera of Africa